Sebastian Küchler-Blessing (born in 1987) is a German organist and music educator.

Life 

Other formative teachers were Manfred Schreier, Hans Michael Beuerle and Zsigmond Szathmáry.

Since 2014, Küchler-Blessing has been active as cathedral organist at Essen Minster, the cathedral of the Roman Catholic Diocese of Essen.

He has played as a soloist under the direction of conductors such as Gustavo Dudamel, Hartmut Haenchen and Winfried Toll. His work also takes him to ensembles such as the Orchestra Mozart led by Claudio Abbado, the Stuttgart Chamber Orchestra conducted by  Wolfram Christ, the Windsbacher Knabenchor directed by Karl-Friedrich Beringer and Martin Lehmann and musicians like Reinhold Friedrich, Gábor Boldoczki, Sibylla Rubens and Severin von Eckardstein together.

He holds a teaching position at the Robert Schumann Hochschule Düsseldorf for organ and liturgical organ play / improvisation and taught in the 2015/16 winter semester in the substitute teaching position for Martin Schmeding at the Freiburg University of Music. 

In 2016, he was a juror at the international organ competition Daniel Herz Brixen.

Prizes 
 2003: Jugend Musiziert National Competition: 1. Prize (Maximum score) – Organ solo
 2004: International Competition for Young Organists Ljubljana: 1. Prize
 2005: Jugend Musiziert National Competition: 1. Prize (Maximum score) – Klavier solo
 2008: International Organ Competition Herford: only prize to be awarded in improvisation
 2009: Internationaler Wettbewerb für Orgelimprovisation Schwäbisch Gmünd (3. Prize and Public Award)
 2010: : Public Award
 2011: International Organ Competition of the : 1. Prize
 2012: International Johann Sebastian Bach Competition Leipzig 
 2012: Felix Mendelssohn Bartholdy Prize 
 2014: Arthur Waser Prize of the Lucerne Symphony Orchestra

Recordings 
 Klais-Orgel Ruhe Christi-Kirche Rottweil: Orgelwerke von Bach, Mozart und Johann Ulrich Steigleder (Production: organum Musikproduktion 2016).
 Cantatas BWV 1 Wie schön leuchtet der Morgenstern, BWV 1, 48, 78 and Wachet auf, ruft uns die Stimme, BWV 140 by J. S. Bach: Windsbacher Knabenchor, Deutsche Kammer-Virtuosen Berlin, Karl-Friedrich Beringer (Production: Sony classical 2012).
 Carl Philipp Emanuel Bach: Hamburger Sinfonien Wq 182: Stuttgarter Kammerorchester, Wolfram Christ (Production: Hänssler Classic 2013).

References

External links 
 
 
 

Cathedral organists
German classical organists
1987 births
Living people